Founded in 1981, Ballet Folklorico Raices Mexicana (sometimes called Baile Folkloric Raices Mexicanas) is a dance troupe and school in southwest Detroit, Michigan, USA. Hermino Pensino and Cristina Huizar were among the founders of the troupe. Huizar was a member of the Ballet Folklorica de Mexico before co-founding the Detroit school. She saw the school as a way of connecting second- and third-generation Mexican-Americans with their heritage. After forming the school, she realized that participation in dance taught the children discipline, self-confidence, excellence, and teamwork. These personal skills helped students outside of dance class: nearly all have graduated from high school.

The dance troupe provides instruction in dances from the Chiapas, Hidalgo, Veracruz, Tamaulipas, Sonora, Jalisco and Aguascalientes states in Mexico.

Corazon del Pueblo
In 2015, the positive experiences of Raices graduates encouraged community organizers to create Corazon del Pueblo, a not-for-profit designed to transform the self-respect that participating in the arts gives students into the belief that they can determine their own future.

In 2016, Corazon del Pueblo won a $25,000 Kresge Artist Fellowship. These fellowships support artists and art organizations in the Detroit metro area.

References

Mexican-American organizations
Dance schools in the United States
1981 establishments in Michigan
Dance in Michigan
Culture of Detroit